Fujikawa may refer to:

 The Fuji River in Japan, called Fuji-kawa in Japanese
 Fujikawa, Shizuoka, Japan
 Fujikawa, Yamanashi, Japan
 Fujikawa (train), a Japanese limited express train

People named
, American illustrator
, Japanese ski mountaineer and telemark skier
, Japanese baseball player
, football player

Fictional Characters
 Rumiko Fujikawa, supporting character in Iron Man comics
 Dr. Wallace Fujikawa ScD, QEnD, the co-creator of the Shaw-Fujikawa Translight Engine in the Halo series.

Japanese-language surnames